Jeannie McDaniel was elected to the Oklahoma House of Representatives to represent District 78 -- Tulsa County—in 2004.

Early life and career
McDaniel grew up in Kenton, Ohio. A long-time Tulsa resident, she retired from the City of Tulsa in 2004 after more than twenty-five years. Before becoming a state legislator she was coordinator for the Tulsa Mayor's Office for Neighborhoods, an entity she created and worked for since 1991. McDaniel has served on the YMCA Tulsa Advisory Board, Metropolitan Tulsa Citizens Crime Commission, Habitat for Humanity, and Youth Services of Tulsa County. She is also a member of the Inter-agency Coordinating Council for Early Childhood Intervention and on the Legislative Advisory Council of the Southern Regional Education Board.

House Committees
 Education
 Common Education
 General Government
 Public Health

References

External links
 Jeannie McDaniel Homepage
 2005-2006 Oklahoma Almanac Online--Oklahoma History 
 Women of the Oklahoma Legislature Oral History Project--OSU Library
 Voices of Oklahoma interview. First person interview conducted on December 2, 2020 with Jeannie McDaniel.

Women state legislators in Oklahoma
Democratic Party members of the Oklahoma House of Representatives
Living people
People from Kenton, Ohio
Politicians from Tulsa, Oklahoma
University of Oklahoma alumni
21st-century American politicians
21st-century American women politicians
Year of birth missing (living people)